Aafat-e-Ishq is a 2021 Indian Hindi-language black comedy film directed by Indrajit Nattoji, and produced by Zee Studios. The film is based on the Hungarian film Liza, the Fox-Fairy.  It features  Neha Sharma, Namit Das, Deepak Dobriyal, Amit Sial. The film was released on 29 October 2021 on ZEE5. The film received mixed reviews, criticizing the pace and writing while appreciating the multigenre filmmaking style, unconventional storytelling, unique cinema art, and outstanding performances.

Synopsis
Lallo is a 30-year-old lonely caretaker of a bedridden widow named Bahuji. Her only friend is a friendly ghost and singer, Atmaram. After reading the fabled Laal Pari book, she thinks she is cursed and whoever falls in love with Lallo dies mysteriously.

Cast
 Neha Sharma as Lallo
 Namit Das as Atmaram, Ghost
 Deepak Dobriyal as Police Investigator, Vikram Kamal
 Amit Sial as Prem Gunjan 
 Ila Arun as Bahuji, widow 
 Archanna Guptaa as Suhani
 Vikram Kochhar as Sunil Samajdhar
 Anil Charanjeett as Pratap
 Darshan Jariwalla as Ramdayal
 Kenisha Awasthi as Zoya
 Garima Jain as the girl in the magazine
 Hetal Puniwala as Postmaster Mishra
 Payas Pandit as a Police constable, Fauzia,

Soundtrack 

The music of the film is composed by Gaurav Chatterji with lyrics written by Ginny Diwan, Sandeep Gaur and Indrajit Nattoji. Namit Das sung the first song in his career.

Release
The film was  released on ZEE5 on 29 October 2021.

Reception 
Hiren Kotwani of The Times of India gave the film 2 out of 5, writing ″At the end of it, Aafat-e-Ishq doesn’t live up to the expectations as a remake of the original Hungarian movie that won several awards at various film festivals.″ Chirantana Bhatt of  Gujarati Mid Day wrote ″It is imperative to talk about how magic realism has been added to the extent and how the presence of art is treated in the direction, cinematography, set-up and other designing of this film. This is an attempt to explore the different ways in which art can be present on the cinema screen.″

References

External links 
 
  Aafat-e-Ishq at ZEE5

ZEE5 original films
2021 films
2020s Hindi-language films
Films scored by Gaurav Chatterji
2021 romance films
2021 thriller films
Indian romantic comedy-drama films
Indian black comedy films
Indian remakes of foreign films